Bardet–Biedl syndrome 5 protein is a protein that in humans is encoded by the BBS5 gene.

This gene encodes a protein that has been directly linked to Bardet–Biedl syndrome. The primary features of this syndrome include retinal dystrophy, obesity, polydactyly, renal abnormalities and learning disabilities. Experimentation in non-human eukaryotes suggests that this gene is expressed in ciliated cells and that it is required for the formation of cilia. Alternate transcriptional splice variants have been observed but have not been fully characterized.

References

External links
 GeneReviews/NIH/NCBI/UW entry on Bardet–Biedl syndrome

Further reading

External links